The Cradle is a prominent  double summit mountain located in Chelan County of Washington state. The mountain's name is derived from the depression between the two peaks of nearly identical elevation. The Cradle is situated within the Alpine Lakes Wilderness and is part of the Wenatchee Mountains, which is subset of the Cascade Range. Its nearest higher peak is Jack Ridge,  to the east-southeast. Precipitation runoff from the mountain drains into tributaries of Icicle Creek, which in turn is a tributary of the Wenatchee River. The first ascent of the south peak was made in 1944 by Gene Paxton and Dwight Watson, whereas the north peak wasn't climbed until 1952 by Bill and Gene Prater.

Climate

Most weather fronts originate in the Pacific Ocean, and travel east toward the Cascade Mountains. As fronts approach, they are forced upward by the peaks of the Cascade Range, causing them to drop their moisture in the form of rain or snowfall onto the Cascades (Orographic lift). As a result, the Cascades experience high precipitation, especially during the winter months in the form of snowfall. During winter months, weather is usually cloudy, but, due to high pressure systems over the Pacific Ocean that intensify during summer months, there is often little or no cloud cover during the summer.

Geology
The Alpine Lakes Wilderness features some of the most rugged topography in the Cascade Range with craggy peaks and ridges, deep glacial valleys, and granite walls spotted with over 700 mountain lakes.  Geological events occurring many years ago created the diverse topography and drastic elevation changes over the Cascade Range leading to the various climate differences.

The history of the formation of the Cascade Mountains dates back millions of years ago to the late Eocene Epoch. With the North American Plate overriding the Pacific Plate, episodes of volcanic igneous activity persisted. In addition, small fragments of the oceanic and continental lithosphere called terranes created the North Cascades about 50 million years ago.

During the Pleistocene period dating back over two million years ago, glaciation advancing and retreating repeatedly scoured the landscape leaving  deposits of rock debris. The last glacial retreat in the Alpine Lakes area began about 14,000 years ago and was north of the Canada–US border by 10,000 years ago. The U-shaped cross section of the river valleys are a result of that recent glaciation. Uplift and faulting in combination with glaciation have been the dominant processes which have created the tall peaks and deep valleys of the Alpine Lakes Wilderness area.

See also

List of peaks of the Alpine Lakes Wilderness
Geology of the Pacific Northwest

Gallery

References

External links
 Weather forecast: The Cradle
Alpine Lakes Wilderness (Okanogan-Wenatchee National Forest) U.S. Forest Service

Mountains of Washington (state)
Mountains of Chelan County, Washington
Cascade Range
North American 2000 m summits